The Beacon, is a novel by English author Susan Hill, first published in 2008 by Chatto and Windus and in paperback the following year by Vintage Books.

Plot introduction
The four Prime children grow up in a bleak North Country farmhouse called 'The Beacon'; Colin and Berenice marry locally, May, the central character of the novel went to university in London but returns within a year. Only quiet, watchful Frank escapes to become a journalist on Fleet Street. But then he publishes a successful novel about his childhood which throws the family into turmoil...

Reception
Joanna Briscoe in The Guardian described it as a "novel of great structural and stylistic control" and as being "an almost perfect little literary novel outside any genre. A cross-generational family story barely longer than a novella, it possesses the light tug of menace and almost invisible haze of tension that characterise Hill's ghost stories, yet there is nothing supernatural about this tale of a farming family grounded in the seasons. The slippery nature of memory is what casts an atmosphere of unease over the novel".
Laura Thompson in The Telegraph writes "this short book is richly satisfying. Hill's craftsmanship is masterly. We are always aware of the farming backdrop: the book begins with a superb evocation of rural hardship, whose inexorable rhythms read like pared-down Thomas Hardy." and goes on to describe it as "a little masterpiece".
The Times said it was "a moving, evocative and rewarding novel".

Radio Dramatisation
The novel was dramatised for BBC Radio 4's Woman's Hour Drama, broadcast in five 15-minute episodes from March 22–26, 2010.

References

External links
Author webpage
Truth, lies and misery lit review by Katy Guest in The Independent
Terrors of the imagination review by Paul Binding in The Spectator
A twisted tale of malice aforethought, review by Nicholas Lezard in The Guardian
Vintage books webpage

Novels by Susan Hill
Family saga novels
2008 British novels
Chatto & Windus books